The 2018 World Rugby Under 20 Championship was the eleventh annual international rugby union competition for Under 20 national teams. The event was organised in France by rugby's governing body, World Rugby. Twelve nations played in the tournament, which was held in three cities from 30 May to 17 June.

Teams
The following teams participated in the 2018 U20 Championship:

Venues
The venues that play host to the tournament were as follows:

Pool stage
The Pool stage fixture was as follows:

Pool A
{| class="wikitable" style="text-align: center;"
|-
!width="200"|Team
!width="20"|Pld
!width="20"|W
!width="20"|D
!width="20"|L
!width="20"|PF
!width="20"|PA
!width="32"|−/+
!width="20"|TF
!width="20"|TA
!width="20"|BP
!width="20"|Pts
|- style="background:#ccffcc;
|align=left| 
| 3 || 3 || 0 || 0 || 136 || 28 || +108 || 19 || 3 || 2 || 14
|-  
|align=left| 
| 3 || 2 || 0 || 1 || 54 || 80 || –26 || 5 || 10 || 0 || 8
|-  
|align=left| 
| 3 || 1 || 0 || 2 || 93 || 72 || +21 || 12 || 8 || 2 || 6
|-  
|align=left| 
| 3 || 0 || 0 || 3 || 36 || 139 || –103 || 6 || 21 || 1 || 1
|}

Pool B
{| class="wikitable" style="text-align: center;"
|-
!width="200"|Team
!width="20"|Pld
!width="20"|W
!width="20"|D
!width="20"|L
!width="20"|PF
!width="20"|PA
!width="32"|−/+
!width="20"|TF
!width="20"|TA
!width="20"|BP
!width="20"|Pts
|- | style="background:#ccffcc;
|align=left| 
| 3 || 3 || 0 || 0 || 117 || 33 || +84 || 18 || 4 || 3 || 15
|-  
|align=left| 
| 3 || 2 || 0 || 1 || 62 || 95 || –33 || 9 || 14 || 2 || 10
|-  
|align=left| 
| 3 || 1 || 0 || 2|| 73 || 82 || –9 || 10 || 10 || 3 || 7
|-  
|align=left| 
| 3 || 0 || 0 || 3 || 49 || 91 || –42 || 5 || 14 || 1 || 1
|}

Pool C
{| class="wikitable" style="text-align: center;"
|-
!width="200"|Team
!width="20"|Pld
!width="20"|W
!width="20"|D
!width="20"|L
!width="20"|PF
!width="20"|PA
!width="32"|−/+
!width="20"|TF
!width="20"|TA
!width="20"|BP
!width="20"|Pts
|- style="background:#ccffcc;
|align=left| 
| 3 || 3 || 0 || 0 || 96 || 65 || +31 || 13 || 10 || 2 || 14
|- style="background:#ccffcc; 
|align=left| 
| 3 || 2 || 0 || 1 || 92 || 90 || +2 || 15 || 11 || 3 || 11
|-  
|align=left| 
| 3 || 1 || 0 || 2 || 63 || 77 || –14 || 8 || 11 || 1 || 5
|-  
|align=left| 
| 3 || 0 || 0 || 3 || 61 || 80 || –19 || 8 || 12 || 2 || 2
|}

Pool stage standings

Knockout stage

9–12th place play-offs

Semi-finals

Eleventh place

Ninth place

5–8th place play-offs

Semi-finals

Seventh place

Fifth place

Finals

Semi-finals

Third place

Final

Statistics
The player statistics for the 2018 U20 Championship:

Final placings

References

External links
 Official website

2018
2018 rugby union tournaments for national teams
2017–18 in French rugby union
International rugby union competitions hosted by France
World Rugby Under 20 Championship
World Rugby Under 20 Championship